Hubert Parot (23 May 1933 – 14 January 2015) was an equestrian from France and Olympic champion. He won a gold medal in show jumping with the French team at the 1976 Summer Olympics in Montreal.

References

1933 births
2015 deaths
French male equestrians
Olympic equestrians of France
Olympic gold medalists for France
Equestrians at the 1972 Summer Olympics
Equestrians at the 1976 Summer Olympics
Olympic medalists in equestrian
Medalists at the 1976 Summer Olympics